The NWL/HoPWF Hardcore Championship is the secondary professional wrestling title in the National Wrestling League promotion. It was first won by Chuckie Manson in a three-way match against Morgus the Maniac, Blood and Shorty Smallz in Martinsburg, West Virginia on October 11, 2003. The title is defended primarily in the Mid-Atlantic and East Coast, most often in Hagerstown, Maryland, but also in Pennsylvania and West Virginia. There are 16 recognized known champions with a total of 23 title reigns.

Title history

References

Hardcore wrestling championships